What a Terrible World, What a Beautiful World is the seventh studio album from The Decemberists, released on January 20, 2015. The album's title comes from a line in the song "12/17/12", a reference to the date of Barack Obama's speech in response to the Sandy Hook Elementary School shooting and lead singer Colin Meloy's conflicting feelings about the shooting and his happy personal life.

Reception

Critical
What a Terrible World, What a Beautiful World received mostly positive reviews. It currently has a metascore of 77 from Metacritic. The Boston Globe described the album as one of the band's "most enjoyable and lively efforts in recent memory", The New York Times noted that What a Terrible World, What a Beautiful World "strikes a note of pop concision and maturity, building on what worked on ‘The King Is Dead.’ Lyrically, there are fewer thistles and minarets and palanquins—and, musically, less digressive excess—than once made up the Decemberists’ trademark style." Jeremy D. Larson of Pitchfork was a detractor, bemoaning the album as "overlong and under-ambitious", though appreciating that listeners "start to see Meloy himself more than ever". Larson also wrote highly of "Make You Better", stating, "The band has never lacked the musical bona fides to write a great anthem."

Commercial

The album debuted at  No. 7 on the Billboard 200 albums chart on its release, selling around 50,000 copies in the United States in its first week. It also debuted at No. 2 on Billboard'''s Top Rock Albums, and No. 1 on the Folk Albums chart. The album has sold 123,000 copies in the United States as of October 2015.

Track listing
All songs written by Colin Meloy.

Personnel

According to the liner notes of What a Terrible World, What a Beautiful World''.

The Decemberists

Colin Meloy – lead vocals, acoustic and electric guitars, bouzouki, harmonica, backing vocals
Chris Funk – acoustic and electric guitars, banjo, bouzouki, mandolin
Jenny Conlee – piano, Hammond organ, vibraphone, accordion, keyboards
Nate Query – bass, upright bass
John Moen – drums, percussion, backing vocals

Additional musicians

Backup singers

Rachel Flotard (tracks 1, 2, 3, 4, 7, 11, 12, 13, 14)
Kelly Hogan (tracks 2, 3, 9, 10, 12)
Laura Veirs (track 5)
Ragen Fykes (tracks 6, 8)
Moorea Masa (tracks 6, 8)
"The Singer Addresses His Audience" Choir: Kyleen King, Laura Veirs, Allison Hall, Bridgit Jacobson, Carson Ellis, Michael Finn, Jeremy Swatzky, Shelley Short, Steven Watkins, Ritchie Young, Moorea Masa
The "Anti-Summersong" Narrator Support Gang: Chris Funk, Nate Query, John Moen, Jason Colton, Tucker Martine

Strings and brass

Rob Moose – violin, fiddle
Kyleen King – viola
Patti King – violin
Anna Fritz – cello
Victor Nash – trumpet

Production

Produced by Tucker Martine with The Decemberists
String arrangements by Rob Moose
Recorded and mixed by Tucker Martine
Mastered by Stephen Marcussen
Assistant engineering by Michael Finn
Design by Jeri Heiden and Glen Nakasako for SMOG Design, Inc.
Illustrations and lettering by Carson Ellis
Photography by Autumn de Wilde

Charts

Weekly charts

Year-end charts

References

2015 albums
The Decemberists albums
Capitol Records albums
Rough Trade Records albums
Albums produced by Tucker Martine